Musselman Cottage is a historic cure cottage located at Saranac Lake, Franklin County, New York. It was built about 1907 and is a -story, frame single-family dwelling covered by a cross-gabled roof. It has a central block with two attached porches and rests on an uncoursed rubble foundation.

It was listed on the National Register of Historic Places in 1992.

References

Houses on the National Register of Historic Places in New York (state)
Colonial Revival architecture in New York (state)
Houses completed in 1907
Houses in Franklin County, New York
National Register of Historic Places in Franklin County, New York